Allan Natachee was a poet from Papua New Guinea. The first Papuan poet in print, he is also sometimes referred to as the 'Papuan Poet Laureate'.

References

External links
Information

Papua New Guinean poets
20th-century poets
Year of birth missing
Year of death missing